This is an alphabetical list of all Nav Canada certified and registered water and land airports, aerodromes and heliports in the Provinces and territories of Canada.

They are listed in the format:
Airport name as listed by either the Canada Flight Supplement (CFS) or the airport authority, alternate name, International Civil Aviation Organization (ICAO) code, Transport Canada Location identifier (TC LID) International Air Transport Association (IATA) code, community and province.

E

F

G

References

E